Inga Berit Svestad (born 28 June 1985 in Åndalsnes) is a Norwegian handball player. She played for Byåsen HE, and on the Norwegian national team.

She made her debut on the Norwegian national team in 2009 in a match against Croatia, and played 13 matches and scored 15 goals for the national team in 2009. With the club Byåsen, she participated in the Women's EHF Champions League nine years in a row, from the 2005–06 season to the 2013–14 season.

References

External links

Norwegian female handball players
1985 births
Living people